World Trade Center Islamabad is a mixed-use 14 story development located on the G.T road, DHA, Islamabad, Pakistan affiliated with the World Trade Centers Association.

The development includes a five-story shopping mall including a 150,000 sqft. Carrefour , six story office tower and a 267-room four-star hotel. The project is owned by multinational organization Giga Group.

The complex opened on August 17, 2016.

Design
The WTC Islamabad building was initially intended to be a 5 Towers High Rise Building. However, the design was later changed to a Low Rise Single Tower Building. The conceptual design of the building came from British architectural firm Atkins. The detailed design was done by Arch Vision Plus.

Construction
Groundbreaking for construction of WTC Islamabad took place on 21 Jan 2008. The project was contracted to a joint consortium of IJM Gulf Malaysia, Mazyood Giga International, and NESPAK. Extensive use of prefabricated components under the supervision of Structure Designer Mr. Orangzaib Alam Khan helped speed up the construction process.

References

Shopping malls in Islamabad
Shopping malls in Pakistan
Hotels in Pakistan
Office buildings in Pakistan
2016 establishments in Pakistan
Shopping malls established in 2016